Virginia B. MacDonald (née Blue) (October 24, 1920 – July 12, 2008) was an American politician.

Born in El Paso, Texas, MacDonald went to the University of New Mexico. MacDonald lived in Arlington Heights, Illinois, and was involved with the Republican Party. She served in the Illinois Constitutional Convention of 1970. MacDonald served in the Illinois House of Representatives from 1973 to 1983. MacDonald then served in the Illinois State Senate from 1983 to 1993. She died at her home in Arlington Heights, Illinois.

Notes

External links

1920 births
2008 deaths
Politicians from El Paso, Texas
People from Arlington Heights, Illinois
University of New Mexico alumni
Women state legislators in Illinois
Republican Party members of the Illinois House of Representatives
Republican Party Illinois state senators
20th-century American politicians
20th-century American women politicians
21st-century American women